Binibining Pilipinas 2010 was the 47th edition Binibining Pilipinas. It took place at the Smart Araneta Coliseum in Quezon City, Metro Manila, Philippines on March 6, 2010.

At the end of the event, Bianca Manalo crowned Venus Raj as Binibining Pilipinas Universe 2010, Marie-Ann Umali crowned Czarina Gatbonton as Binibining Pilipinas World 2010, and Melody Adelheid Gersbach crowned Krista Kleiner as Binibining Pilipinas International 2010. Dianne Necio was named 1st Runner-Up and Helen Nicolette Henson was named 2nd Runner-Up.

This is also the last year of the Miss World Philippines title to be under Binibining Pilipinas after the franchise of Miss World Philippines was transferred to the Miss World Philippines Organization.

Results
Color keys
  The contestant was a Runner-up in an International pageant.
  The contestant was a Semi-Finalist in an International pageant.
  The contestant did not place.

Special Awards

Judges 
 H.E. Thierry Borja de Mozota – Ambassador of France to the Philippines
 H.E. Ivan J. Crespo – Ambassador of Panama to the Philippines
 Mike Enriquez – Filipino journalist, GMA-7 news anchor
 Juvenal Sanso – Painter
 Aurora Pijuan – Miss International 1970
 Claudine Barretto – Movie and television actress
 Nonito Donaire – WBA Interim World Super Flyweight Champion
 Gabe Norwood – Professional basketball player
 Jaime Bautista – President and Chief Operating Staff of Philippine Airlines Inc.
 Goran Aleksandrovski – General Manager of Sofitel Philippine Plaza
 Vice Admiral Ferdinand Golez – 30th Flag Officer in Command of the Philippine Navy

Contestants
24 contestants competed for the three titles.

Notes

Post-pageant Notes 

 On March 29, 2010, less than a month after being crowned as Binibining Pilipinas Universe 2010, Venus Raj was stripped off the aforementioned title due to inconsistencies with her birth certificate. The title was given to Helen Nicolette Henson, the 2nd Runner-Up, since Dianne Necio, the 1st Runner-Up, is not yet eligible to compete at Miss Universe due to being underage. However on April 10, 2010, Raj was allowed to reclaim her title as Binibining Pilipinas Universe 2010. Raj competed at Miss Universe 2010 in Las Vegas, Nevada and was named 4th Runner-Up.
 Czarina Gatbonton competed at Miss World 2010 in Sanya, China but was unplaced. After her stint in Miss World, Gatbonton competed at Miss Humanity International 2011 in Barbados where she was named 2nd Runner-Up. She also won the Best in Talent Award and the Humanitarian Queen for Asia-Pacific title.
 Krista Kleiner competed at Miss International 2010 in Chengdu, China and was one of the fifteen semifinalists. She also won the Miss Talent and Miss Expressive awards.
 Dianne Necio competed again at Binibining Pilipinas 2011 and won Binibining Pilipinas International 2011. She competed at Miss International 2011 in Chengdu, China and was one of the fifteen semifinalists. She also won the Miss Internet Popularity award.
 Both Gwendoline Ruais and Helen Nicolette Henson competed at Miss World Philippines 2011. Henson was named 1st Runner-Up while Ruais won the Miss World Philippines 2011 title. Ruais competed at Miss World 2011 in London and was named 1st Runner-Up.

References

External links
 Binibining Pilipinas Official Website

2010
2010 in the Philippines
2010 beauty pageants